Sharktopus vs. Whalewolf is a television film that premiered on July 19, 2015 on Syfy.

It is the third and final installment in the Sharktopus franchise, after Sharktopus (2010) and Sharktopus vs. Pteracuda (2014).

Plot

Since its fight with the Pteracuda, the Sharktopus is still at large and is lurking in the waters of the Dominican Republic. An alcoholic boat captain named Ray (Casper Van Dien) and his sidekick Pablo (Jorge Eduardo de los Santos) are enlisted by a voodoo priest named Tiny (Tony Almont) to obtain the heart of the Sharktopus. Meanwhile, Dr. Reinhart (Catherine Oxenberg), a mad scientist who studied with the late Nathan Sands and the late Rico Symes from the previous two Sharktopus movies, mixes the genes of a killer whale and a wolf (resembling the extinct Pakicetus, an ancestor of modern whales). The resulting treatment transforms Felix Rosa (Mario Artura Hernandez) into the Whalewolf, which causes havoc and results in it fighting with the Sharktopus then he dies.

Cast
 Catherine Oxenberg as Dr. Reinhart
 Casper Van Dien as Ray
 Akari Endo as Officer Nita Morales
 Jorge Eduardo de los Santos as Pablo
 Jennifer Wenger as Betty
 Tony Almont as "Tiny"
 Mario Arturo Hernández as Felix Rosa

Home media
No U.S. DVDs of this film were made, but Regions 2 and 4 DVDs were made and are available online.

References

External links
 Sharktopus vs. Whalewolf at Internet Movie Database

2015 television films
2015 films
American science fiction horror films
2010s English-language films
2015 horror films
American natural horror films
Syfy original films
2010s science fiction horror films
Fictional undersea characters
Films about genetic engineering
Mad scientist films
American independent films
2010s monster movies
Giant monster films
Films about shark attacks
Films about sharks
American monster movies
American horror television films
Sharktopus films
2015 independent films
Films set in the Dominican Republic
Films produced by Roger Corman
Films directed by Kevin O'Neill (director)
2010s American films